Bruce Jay Nelson (January 19, 1952 – September 19, 1999) was an American computer scientist best known as the inventor of the remote procedure call concept for computer network communications.

Bruce Nelson graduated from Harvey Mudd College in 1974, and went on to earn a master's in computer science from Stanford University in 1976, and a Ph.D. in computer science from Carnegie Mellon University in 1982. While pursuing his Ph.D., he worked at Xerox PARC where he developed the concept of Remote Procedure Call (RPC).
He and his collaborator Andrew Birrell were awarded the 1994 Association for Computing Machinery (ACM) Software System Award for the work on RPC.
In 1996 he joined Cisco Systems as Chief Science Officer.

He died September 19, 1999, due to complications from an aortic dissection, while on a business trip to Tel Aviv, Israel.
In 2007 the Birrell and Nelson paper won an operating system hall of fame award from the ACM. Classmates and friends endowed a scholarship in his name at Carnegie Mellon. 
Harvey Mudd College also named a speaker series in his honor.

He was an avid photographer, backpacker, free-diver and world traveler.
His outgoing and eccentric personality included a fascination with crows, leading a friend to name his company "Caw Networks".

Published papers

References

1952 births
1999 deaths
Harvey Mudd College alumni
Carnegie Mellon University alumni
Deaths from aortic dissection
American computer scientists
Place of birth missing